Babak Salari (born March 21, 1959) is Iranian-Canadian freelance photographer, based in Montreal, educated at Concordia University and Dawson College and specialized in black and white documentary photography.

Born in Shiraz, Iran, Salari's interest in photography began as a teenager in his native Iran where he contributed to various publications. Salari has been documenting the life of common people in Afghanistan, Jordan, Iraq, Kurdistan, Palestine, Israel, Mexico, Cuba, Bulgaria. He has received many awards, including a Gold Addy from the American Ad Federation in 2004 for his work Locating Afghanistan.

Publications 
Four of his projects have been published by publishing house Janet 45: 
 Traumas and Miracles: Portraits of Northwestern Bulgaria(2010, in collaboration with Diana Ivanova)
 My Street: Cuban Stories (2010, in collaboration with Diana Ivanova)
 Remembering the People of Afghanistan (2009)
 Faces, Bodies, Personas: Tracing Cuban Stories (2008).

References

External links
 Salari's webpage
 Salari's books
 My Street project page
 New bent on the Cuban revolution, an interview in Hour magazine
 Glimpses of queer Cuba, review in Montreal Mirror
 A conversation with Babak Salari in Slightly Lucid, a visual arts and photography blog
 The Traumas & the Miracles of Babak Salari - videointerview before the opening of Salari's exhibition "Traumas and Miracles: The Portraits of Northwestern Bulgaria", October 13-25th, 2011
 In black and white, interview for the Bulgarian magazine Programata

1959 births
Living people
Iranian emigrants to Canada
Iranian photographers
Canadian photographers
Dawson College alumni
Concordia University alumni